Abies pinsapo, the Spanish fir, is a species of tree in the family Pinaceae, native to southern Spain and northern Morocco.

Description
Abies pinsapo is an evergreen conifer growing to 20–30 m tall, with a conic crown, sometimes becoming irregular with age. The leaves are 1.5–2 cm long, arranged radially all round the shoots, and are strongly glaucous pale blue-green, with broad bands of whitish wax on both sides. The cones are cylindrical, 9–18 cm long, greenish-pink to purple before maturity, and smooth with the bract scales short and not exserted. When mature, they disintegrate to release the winged seeds.

The Moroccan variety, Abies pinsapo var. marocana or the Moroccan fir, differs in the leaves being less strongly glaucous and the cones slightly longer, 11–20 cm long.

The cultivars A. pinsapo ‘Aurea’ (to 8m, with golden new growth)
and A. pinsapo 'Glauca'  (to 12m plus, with grey-green leaves)
have gained the Royal Horticultural Society's Award of Garden Merit.

Conservation
Spanish fir, despite the best conservation and reforestation efforts that have greatly increased its abundance, still has several threats such as fires, urban projects, erosion, excessive visitors and tourists, etc.

Gallery

References

External links
Tourist information for the Sierra de Grazalema and surrounding areas
 Abies pinsapo - distribution map and related resources at European Forest Genetic Resources Programme (EUFORGEN) 
 Abies marocana - distribution map and related resources at EUFORGEN

pinsapo
Near threatened plants
Trees of Mediterranean climate
Trees of Morocco
Trees of Europe
Taxa named by Pierre Edmond Boissier